Iqbal Umar was a Pakistani first-class cricketer who played for Karachi University. He played only one first-class cricket match in 1964/65. He also served as a president of the Karachi Cotton Exchange.

He died in Karachi at the age of 74.

References

External links
 

1941 births
2017 deaths
Pakistani cricketers
Karachi University cricketers
Cricketers from Karachi